Stomphastis heringi is a moth of the family Gracillariidae. It is known from Ethiopia.

The larvae feed on Croton macrostachyus. They probably mine the leaves of their host plant.

References

Endemic fauna of Ethiopia
Stomphastis
Insects of Ethiopia
Moths of Africa